is the first album by Keyakizaka46. It was released on July 19, 2017.

Track listing

Disc 1 (Type-A・Type-B)

Disc 2 (Type-A)

Disc 2 (Type-B)

Disc 3 (Type-A)

Disc 3 (Type-B)

Regular edition

Chart

Accolade

References

2017 albums